One-Way to Tomorrow is a 2020 Turkish drama film directed by Ozan Açıktan and written by Faruk Ozerten. Starring Metin Akdülger and Dilan Çiçek Deniz, the film is a remake of the 2014 Swedish film How to Stop a Wedding.

Plot 

A young woman, Leyla, boards a train to Izmir without a ticket.  She finds herself sharing a coupé with Ali, a talkative and social young lawyer, on his way to interrupt his ex-girlfriend Burcu's wedding. The two get of to a bumpy start, but as Leyla finds herself in trouble for not having a ticket, Ali decides to help her stay aboard. As the journey is 14 hours they decide to make peace and through the conversation find that their journeys are intertwined in unexpected ways that change their perspective on their plans and each other.

Cast 
 Metin Akdülger as Ali
 Dilan Çiçek Deniz as Leyla
 Tevfik Kartal as conductor
 Fatma Filiz Sencan as toll clerk
 Ömür Kayakırılmaz as taxi driver

Release
One-Way to Tomorrow was released on June 19, 2020.

References

External links
 
 

2020 films
2020s Turkish-language films
Turkish-language Netflix original films
Films shot in İzmir
Films set in İzmir
Turkish romantic comedy films